Alma Caribeña - Caribbean Soul is the ninth studio solo album and third Spanish album recorded by Cuban-American singer-songwriter Gloria Estefan.  It was first released by Epic Records in France on May 9, 2000, and in North America on May 23, 2000.

Reception

At the 43rd Annual Grammy Awards, in February 2001, the album won the award for Best Tropical Latin Album, giving Estefan her third win in this category. At the 1st Annual Latin Grammy Awards, in September 2000, the video for the first single "No Me Dejes de Querer", directed by Emilio Estefan Jr. and Gloria Estefan, won Best Music Video. At the Billboard Latin Music Awards, the album won the award for Best Tropical Salsa Album.

Track listing

Charts

Weekly charts

Year-end charts

Certifications

Awards

Release history

See also
List of number-one Billboard Top Latin Albums of 2000
List of number-one Billboard Tropical Albums from the 2000s

References

2000 albums
Gloria Estefan albums
Epic Records albums
Spanish-language albums
Albums produced by Emilio Estefan
Grammy Award for Best Tropical Latin Album